MBK SPU Nitra is a professional basketball club from Nitra, Slovakia. The team plays its games at the City Hall, which has place for 1,500 spectators. The club has won the domestic championship three times in its history. After the 2017–18 season, Nitra withdrew from the Extraliga.

Honours
Slovak Extraliga
Winners (2): 2004–05, 2008–09
Slovak Cup
Winners (1): 2012

Players

Notable players

 Ater Majok

References

Basketball teams in Slovakia
Sport in Nitra
1994 establishments in Slovakia
Basketball teams established in 1994